Friedrich Richter (born Friedrich Rosenthal; 5 June 1894 – 3 March 1984) was a German actor. He appeared in more than seventy films from 1943 to 1984.

Selected filmography

References

External links 

1894 births
1984 deaths
German male stage actors
German male film actors
German male television actors